Sorbus californica, the California mountain ash, is an aggregate species of rowans native to western North America.  The tree or bush is found in the mountains of California as the name suggests, but is not an ash, and this plant is sometimes cultivated. It has orange-red fruit and compound leaves (many leaflets) that are toothed almost from base to apex, but is said to be most often confounded with the western North American species S. occidentalis which has pinkish fruit and leaflets with few teeth.

References 

californica